Mathieu Corbeil-Thériault (born September 27, 1991), also known as Mathieu Corbeil, is a Canadian ice hockey goaltender.  He was selected by the Columbus Blue Jackets of the National Hockey League in the 4th round (102nd overall) of the 2010 NHL Entry Draft.

Major Junior Career
Corbeil-Thériault began his Major Junior career with the Halifax Mooseheads of the QMJHL for the 2008–09 season.  On January 6, 2011, he was traded by the Mooseheads to the Saint John Sea Dogs, also of the QMJHL.  He concluded his Major Junior Career after the 2011–12 season.

Professional career
On October 18, 2011, the Columbus Blue Jackets, who held his National Hockey League rights, added Corbeil-Thériault to their roster on emergency recall from the Quebec Major Junior Hockey League to dress behind starting goaltender Steve Mason for a home game loss against the visiting Dallas Stars, though he did not play in the game.  On October 19, 2011, the Blue Jackets reassigned him to the Sea Dogs.

After the Blue Jackets decided not to re-sign him, Corbeil-Thériault signed with the Chicago Wolves of the American Hockey League on August 8, 2012.  On October 8, 2012, he was assigned by the Wolves to the Missouri Mavericks of the Central Hockey League.  On January 14, 2013, he was recalled by the Wolves from the Mavericks.  After dressing for, but not playing in, the Wolves's game against the Texas Stars on January 16, 2013, he was reassigned to the Missouri Mavericks on January 17, 2013.  After starting for the Mavericks in his first game after being reassigned, he was once again recalled by the Chicago Wolves on January 19, 2013.  On January 26, 2013, he was reassigned to the Missouri Mavericks of the Central Hockey League once again.  On January 29, 2013, he was recalled by the Wolves, before once again being reassigned to the Mavericks on February 6, 2013.  On February 22, 2013, he was once again recalled by the Wolves.  On March 7, 2013, the Wolves reassigned him to the Mavericks.

On July 18, 2013, Corbeil-Thériault signed with the Utica Comets of the American Hockey League.  On October 3 of that year, the Comets assigned him to the St. Charles Chill of the Central Hockey League. On November 22, he was assigned to the Wheeling Nailers of the ECHL and on November 30, he recorded a shutout in his ECHL debut.

He's currently playing for the team HC ’05 Banská Bystrica, HK Poprad and HK Martin in Slovak Extraliga.

Career statistics

Regular season

Postseason

Memorial Cup

Awards and honours

References

External links

Mathieu Corbeil-Thériault's Central Hockey League Profile
Mathieu Corbeil-Thériault's QMJHL Profile (French-language website)
Mathieu Corbeil-Thériault's QMJHL Profile (English-language website)
Mathieu Corbeil-Thériault's The Hockey News Prospect Profile

1991 births
Living people
Canadian ice hockey goaltenders
Columbus Blue Jackets draft picks
French Quebecers
Gwinnett Gladiators players
Ice hockey people from Montreal
Missouri Mavericks players
Halifax Mooseheads players
Saint John Sea Dogs players
St. Charles Chill players
Utica Comets players
Wheeling Nailers players
HK Poprad players
HC '05 Banská Bystrica players
MHC Martin players
Canadian expatriate ice hockey players in the United States
Canadian expatriate ice hockey players in Austria
Canadian expatriate ice hockey players in Croatia
Canadian expatriate ice hockey players in Slovakia